Akın is a Turkish given name and surname, meaning "flood", "stream", or "attack", and may refer to:

Given name
Akın Altıok (born 1932), Turkish triple jumper
Akın Birdal (born 1948), Turkish politician
Akın Eldes (born 1962), Turkish guitarist
Akın Kuloğlu (1972–2001), Georgian-born Turkish boxer
Akın Öngör (born 1945), Turkish business executive 
Akın Öztürk (born 1952), Turkish general
Akın Vardar (born 1978), Turkish footballer

Surname
Azra Akın (born 1981), Turkish model and Miss World
Bülent Akın (born 1978), Turkish footballer
Can Akın (born 1983), Turkish basketball player
Çağla Akın (born 1995), Turkish female volleyball player
Cenan Akın (1932–2006), Turkish composer, conductor and music educator
Didem Akın (born 1971), Turkish basketball coach and former player
Fatih Akın (born 1973), Turkish film director
Filiz Akın (born 1943), Turkish film actress
Gülten Akın (born 1933), Turkish woman poet
İbrahim Akın (born 1984), Turkish footballer
Nazan Akın (born 1983), Turkish female Paralympic judoka
Özge Akın (born 1985), Turkish female sprinter
Şenol Akın (born 1984), Turkish footballer
Serhat Akın (born 1981), Turkish footballer
Sunay Akın (born 1962), Turkish journalist, writer and poet

See also
Akin (disambiguation)

Turkish-language surnames
Turkish masculine given names